Abhra Mondal (born 14 July 1986) is an Indian goalkeeper coach and former footballer, who played as a goalkeeper.

Career

East Bengal
Mondal signed for East Bengal FC in 2005 and ever since Mondal has mostly been used in the Federation Cup matches. After a spending two years at Pune, Mondal returned to East Bengal for the 2013-14 season.

Loan to Pune
On 24 November 2011 Mondal was officially loaned out by East Bengal to fellow I-League club Pune F.C. for the 2011-12 I-League season. He then made his debut for Pune against Air India FC in the I-League and helped Pune to the 2-0 victory.
In his short stint, till he suffered a shin bone injury in a match against Lajong FC, he ensured that his side remained unbeaten in all the matches he played in I-League.

Pune F.C
On 11 July 2012, he signed a full contract with the club. This came after an impressive 11-match unbeaten streak and turned out to be hailed as the biggest protagonist in the club's record and longest unbeaten run ever in the I-League.

Bengaluru FC
He was picked by Bengaluru FC on 23 July 2017 in ISL draft.

References

External links
 Goal.com
 Pune FC

Indian footballers
1986 births
Living people
Footballers from Kolkata
East Bengal Club players
Association football goalkeepers
Pune FC players
Bengaluru FC players
I-League players